The Royal Aircraft Factory B.E.10 was an aircraft based on the B.E.2c, designed in May 1914. The aircraft was intended to be built with a fabric-covered steel-tube fuselage with pressed alloy sheet ribs, and full-length ailerons. Its wingspan was slightly less than that of the B.E.2c, while it also had a deeper coaming and utilized an oleo undercarriage with a small "buffer" nosewheel. As well, the aerofoil had a reflex trailing edge. Although 4 units were ordered from the Bristol Aeroplane Company, they were never completed before the order was cancelled.

Specifications

Notes

References

1910s British military reconnaissance aircraft
Military aircraft of World War I
BE02
Single-engined tractor aircraft
Biplanes